Achrysonini is a tribe of beetles in the subfamily Cerambycinae, mainly found in Africa, Asia, and Southern Europe.

Genera 
 Abyarachryson
 Achryson
 Allogaster
 Aquinillum
 Capegaster
 Cerdaia
 Cotyachryson
 Crotchiella
 Drascalia
 Enosmaeus
 Esseiachryson
 Geropa
 Huequenia
 Icosium
 Neoachryson
 Xenocompsa

References

 
Polyphaga tribes